The 2012 French Super Series is a top level badminton competition which took place from October 23, 2012 to October 28, 2012 in Paris, France. It was the tenth BWF Super Series competition on the 2012 BWF Super Series schedule. The total purse for the event was $200,000.

Men's singles

Seeds

 Simon Santoso (withdrew)
 Sho Sasaki
 Peter Gade
 Du Pengyu
 Kenichi Tago
 Jan Ø. Jørgensen
 Hu Yun
 Wang Zhengming

Top half

Bottom half

Finals

Women's singles

Seeds

 Saina Nehwal
 Wang Shixian (second round)
 Tine Baun
 Juliane Schenk
 Sung Ji-hyun
 Jiang Yanjiao
 Ratchanok Inthanon
 Bae Youn-joo

Top half

Bottom half

Finals

Men's doubles

Seeds

 Mathias Boe / Carsten Mogensen
 Koo Kien Keat / Tan Boon Heong
 Hiroyuki Endo / Kenichi Hayakawa
 Kim Ki-jung / Kim Sa-rang
 Hong Wei / Shen Ye
 Hirokatsu Hashimoto / Noriyasu Hirata
 Bodin Issara / Maneepong Jongjit
 Liu Xiaolong / Qiu Zihan

Top half

Bottom half

Finals

Women's doubles

Seeds

 Christinna Pedersen / Kamilla Rytter Juhl
 Bao Yixin / Zhong Qianxin
 Shizuka Matsuo / Mami Naito
 Misaki Matsutomo / Ayaka Takahashi
 Eom Hye-won / Jang Ye-na
 Shinta Mulia Sari / Yao Lei
 Poon Lok Yan / Tse Ying Suet
 Duanganong Aroonkesorn / Kunchala Voravichitchaikul

Top half

Bottom half

Finals

Mixed doubles

Seeds

 Xu Chen / Ma Jin
 Zhang Nan / Zhao Yunlei
 Joachim Fischer Nielsen / Christinna Pedersen
 Tantowi Ahmad / Lilyana Natsir
 Chan Peng Soon / Goh Liu Ying
 Muhammad Rijal / Debby Susanto
 Chris Adcock /  Imogen Bankier
 Danny Bawa Chrisnanta / Yu Yan Vanessa Neo

Top half

Bottom half

Finals

References

French Super Series
French
French Open (badminton)